DID is an acronym commonly used for dissociative identity disorder, a psychiatric condition.

DID, or did, may also refer to:

Art and entertainment 
 Dance India Dance, a reality dance show on Zee TV, first aired in 2009
 Digital Image Design, a video game developer
 Dog Is Dead, a five-piece indie pop band from Nottingham, England

Mathematics and science
 Difference in differences, a statistical technique
 Discharge ionization detector, a detector in gas chromatography
 Dodecadodecahedron, a uniform polyhedron

Other uses 
 Decentralized identifiers, a type of identifier in web applications
 Data item descriptions, a specification used by United States Department of Defense contractors
 Direct inward dialing, in telephony
 Développement International Desjardins, a subsidiary of the Quebec-based Desjardins Group, a financial services company
 Dublin Institute of Design, a higher education college in Dublin, Ireland
 DID, the National Rail code for Didcot Parkway railway station in the county of Oxfordshire, UK

See also